The 2015 UTEP Miners football team represented the University of Texas at El Paso in the 2015 NCAA Division I FBS football season. This was the third year for head coach Sean Kugler both with UTEP and overall. They were members of the West Division of Conference USA. The Miners played their home games in El Paso, Texas at the Sun Bowl Stadium. They finished the season 5–7, 3–5 in C-USA play to finish in a three way tie for third place in the West Division. UTEP averaged 23,212 fans per game.

Schedule
UTEP announced their 2015 football schedule on February 2, 2015. The 2015 schedule consist of five home and seven away games in the regular season. The Miners will host CUSA foes Florida Atlantic, Louisiana Tech, Rice, and UTSA, and will travel to Florida International (FIU), North Texas, Old Dominion, and Southern Miss.

Schedule source:

Game summaries

at Arkansas

at Texas Tech

at New Mexico State

Incarnate Word

UTSA

at FIU

Florida Atlantic

at Southern Miss

Rice

at Old Dominion

Louisiana Tech

at North Texas

References

UTEP
UTEP Miners football seasons
UTEP Miners football